The 1915 Princeton Tigers football team represented Princeton University in the 1915 college football season. The team finished with a 6–2 record under first-year head coach John H. Rush. No Princeton players were selected as consensus first-team honorees on the 1915 College Football All-America Team, but three players (halfback Dave Tibbott, fullback Edward H. Driggs, and end Jack "Red" Lamberton) were selected as first-team honorees by at least one selector.

Schedule

References

Princeton
Princeton Tigers football seasons
Princeton Tigers football